Michael Vernon (1932–1993) was an Australian consumer activist.

Michael or Mike or Mickey Vernon may also refer to:

 Mike Vernon (ice hockey) (born 1963), Canadian former NHL goaltender
 Mike Vernon (record producer) (born 1944), British record producer
 Mickey Vernon (1918–2008), American baseball player